Hojjatabad (also Romanized as Ḩojjatābād; also known as Khānlarābād and Sartak) is a village in Momenabad Rural District, in the Central District of Sarbisheh County, South Khorasan Province, Iran. At the 2006 census, its population was 245, in 58 families.

References 

Populated places in Sarbisheh County